The 1998 Mr. Olympia contest was an IFBB professional bodybuilding competition held on October 10, 1998, at Madison Square Garden in New York City, New York.

Results
The total prize money awarded was $300,000.

Notable events
Dorian Yates, who sustained a severe triceps injury before winning the 1997 Mr. Olympia, announced his retirement leaving way for a new champion
Ronnie Coleman surprised the field by winning the title over the more established favorites, Flex Wheeler, Nasser El Sonbaty, Kevin Levrone and Shawn Ray
Paul Dillett was suffering from severe dehydration and passed out after just 10 minutes of pre-judging, and dropped out of the competition

References

External links 
 Mr. Olympia

 1999
1998 in American sports
1998 in bodybuilding